Heliactinidia tornensis is a moth of the subfamily Arctiinae. It was described by Prout in 1918. It is found in Colombia.

References

Arctiinae
Moths described in 1918